Concepción León Mora (born 9 December 1973), is a playwright, actress, director and Yucatecan theater teacher. Her work incorporates the tradition, costumes and life of the Maya and the Mayan culture. She was awarded a prize for her social work through theater by the Human Rights Commission in 2011.

Biography
Concepción León Mora born in Mérida, Yucatán, Mexico, 9 December 1973, is better known as Conchi León. She studied theater direction for children, literature and drama. León held an artistic residence in New York City in 2014. She has been invited by the Yucatánstate government to present her productions. León's work has been showcased in London, the United States, Argentina, Spain, Chile, the Philippines and Germany.  She has used her work as a teacher to create projects for the formation and development of theater focusing on children with special needs as well as working to use theater as a means of social rehabilitation for minor offenders and the homeless. Dramatically her work raises the issues of ethnic discrimination, homophobia, violence against women and the human rights of disabled people. She works with the unique features of the Mayan culture.

She is a member of the National System of Art Creators of Mexico and founder of the Municipal Theater Company, Sa'as Tún, of Acapulco. León worked with the Yucatán newspaper Milenio to produce a column called "Where the lion dwells", dedicated to theater reviews. She also works with the Yucatán department of Culture and the arts.

Publications
 "The Believers.", 2004.
 García, Óscar Armando (coord. And ed.)
 Teaching anthology of Mexican theater. 1964-2005
 León Mora Concepción "Mestiza power", 2006.
 “Everything I found in the Water”, 2009.
 Regional Trilogy: Childhood Rituals.

Theatrical works 
 Lion cub. Almost everything about my father.
 Extermination trials
 The kingdom of salamanders
 Still ... always
 Memories of two Caracol children
 Rain stone
 Of children, fish and other lunatic monsters
 Henequen stories
 The dark side of the force
 Tolok Paradise
 The laundry is washed at home
 Yesterday's love
 In the middle of the salty sea
 Everything I found in the water
 Mestiza Power, released on May 28, 2005, Mérida Yucatán, Mexico.
 Chronicle of a Foreboding, released on January 11, 2007, Mérida Yucatán, Mexico.
 The perfect love of two dysfunctional umbrellas, released in March 2008, Buenos Aires, Argentina.
 You will sanctify the Fiestas, premiered on October 20, 2008, Buenos Aires, Argentina.
 Puch de Amor, released on November 11, 2008, Mérida Yucatán, Mexico.
 Confessions of seven women sinning alone, released on June 3, 2009, Valencia, Spain.
 Dirty clothes are washed at home, premiered on August 11, 2009, Mérida Yucatán, Mexico.
 Metamorphosis before the Water, released on October 9, 2009, Mexico City.
 Las Huiras of the Sierra Papakal, released in October 2009, Mérida Yucatán, Mexico.
 The other cruelty. Triptych of love and thorns. 2010
 From the spring of the heart, released on June 25, 2016, Mérida Yucatán, Mexico.
 Shellside . Stories of women in prison
 The wait
 A thousand small stars
 I talked to him
 A heart without sleep
 Santiago dances
 Dzemul's Puruxones
 After eclipse

References and sources

1973 births
21st-century Mexican women writers
Mexican theatre directors
Actresses from Yucatán (state)
Living people